Lucas Alfredo Bovaglio (born 19 April 1979) is an Argentine football manager and former player who played as a central defender. He is the current manager of Instituto.

Teams
He played for Argentine clubs Atlético Rafaela (1998–2000, 2001–2003, 2006, 2009–2011, and 2012–2014), Los Andes (2000–2001) and Talleres de Córdoba (2014–2016), in Venezuelan football for Unión Atlético Maracaibo (2004–2006) and Deportivo Táchira (2007–2009), and for Mexican club Estudiantes Tecos (2011–2012).

References

External links
 
 

1979 births
Living people
Argentine footballers
Argentine expatriate footballers
Liga MX players
Primera Nacional players
Club Atlético Los Andes footballers
UA Maracaibo players
Deportivo Táchira F.C. players
Atlético de Rafaela footballers
Tecos F.C. footballers
Talleres de Córdoba footballers
Expatriate footballers in Venezuela
Expatriate footballers in Mexico
Association football central defenders
People from Rafaela
Sportspeople from Santa Fe Province
Argentine football managers
Atlético de Rafaela managers
Instituto managers